Gimme Five is the second album by the Canadian alternative rock band The Killjoys. It was released in 1996. The album was recorded at Ardent Studios in Memphis, Tennessee. The album featured the hit singles "Rave + Drool" and "Soaked", the latter which peaked at #20 on the Canadian singles chart. "Rave + Drool" appeared on the original Big Shiny Tunes compilation album.

Track listing 
All songs written by Mike Trebilcock, except where noted.
 "Rave + Drool" – 4:02
 "Like I Care" – 3:22
 "Sick of You" – 3:31
 "Like a Girl Jesus" (Scott Miller) – 2:55
 "Soaked" – 3:16
 "Spacegirl" (Gene Champagne) – 0:50
 "Brand New Neighbour" – 2:47
 "Look Like Me" – 2:54
 "C-Monkey" – 3:03
 "Everything" (Trebilcock, Champagne) – 2:52
 "Grown up Scared" – 0:49
 "Exit Wound" – 2:33
 "Rec Room" – 3:35

Personnel 
 Mike Trebilcock – guitars, vocals
 Gene Champagne – drums, guitars, vocals on "Spacegirl"
 Shelley Woods – bass, vocals

Technical personnel 
 Rick Clark – production
 The Killjoys – production
 Skidd Mills – engineering
 Matt Martone – additional engineering
 Jefferey Reid – additional engineering
 Tim Hevesi – additional production and engineering, mixing at Soho Common Recording House (tracks 1–5, 8, 10, 12, 13)
 Mike Trebilcock – mixing at Soho Common Recording House (tracks 1–5, 8, 10, 12, 13), recording and mixing in his bedroom (track 6), photography and illustrations, layout and design
 Terry Brown – mixing  at Metalworks Studios (tracks 7, 9, 11)
 Bill Kipper – mastering at SNB, Montreal
 Peter Moore – digital editing (tracks 8, 10)
 Paul Sparrow – cover photography, layout and design

References 

The Killjoys (Canadian band) albums
1996 albums